Botswana participated in the 2010 Summer Youth Olympics in Singapore.

The Botswana team consisted of five athletes competing in three sports: athletics, judo and swimming.

Athletics

Boys
Field Events

Girls
Track and Road Events

Judo

Individual

Team

Swimming

References

External links
Competitors List: Botswana

Nations at the 2010 Summer Youth Olympics
2010 in Botswana sport
Botswana at the Youth Olympics